Meat glaze, French: glace de viande, is a dark brown, gelatinous flavouring agent used in food preparation.  It is obtained by reducing brown stock through evaporation by slow heating. Compared toDemi-glace, meat glaze is about twice as concentrated.
Its high viscosity and salt content gives it an unusually long shelf life.

Meat glaze used to add flavor to soups.

See also 
Demi-glace

References

French cuisine